Sujātā is an Indian popular feminine given name, which means "birth", "from a good family origin" and"origin".

Notable people named Sujata 
 Sujata (milkmaid) Sujata is believed to have given a bowl of milk rice to Buddha, his last meal before enlightenment.  
 Sujata Bhatt (born May 6, 1956), German-Indian poet.
 Sujata Day,  (born June 27, 1984), American-Indian actress, model and screenwriter.
 Sujata Keshavan (born 1961), Indian graphic designer.
 Sujata Manohar (born August 28, 1934), Indian judge and member of the National Human Rights Commission of India.
 Sujata Massey (born 1964), American-British writer.
 Sujata Mohapatra (born June 27, 1968), Indian choreographer and dancer
 Sujata Nahar (born December 12, 1925 – died May 4, 2007), Indian writer.
 Sujata Sridhar  (born December 25, 1961), Indian cricketer.
 Sujata (actress), Bangladeshi film actress.

Notable people named Sujatha 
 Sujatha (actress) (born December 10, 1952 – died April 6, 2011), Indian actress.
 Sujatha Alahakoon  (born March 9, 1959), Sri Lankan politician.
 Sujatha Mohan (born March 31, 1963), Indian singer.
 Sujatha (born May 3, 1935 – died February 27, 2008), Indian writer.
 Sujatha Sivakumar, Indian actress.
 C. S. Sujatha (born May 28, 1965), Indian politician and member of the 14th Lok Sabha of India.

Others
 Sujata and seven types of wives, the unruly daughter-in-law of Anathapindika, a lay-disciple of the Buddha, who later became a slave-wife to her husband . 
 Sujata Bhikkhuni, one of the Buddha's arahant nuns.
 Sujata is a name of the Hindu goddess Lakshmi.

Indian feminine given names